José Carlos Avellar (15 December 1936 – 18 March 2016) was a Brazilian film critic and essayist.

Born in Rio de Janeiro in 1936, Avellar worked for over twenty years as a film critic for the Jornal do Brasil. Avellar was also a film critic for Escrever Cinema and taught film at the University of Guadalajara in Mexico. Avellar published six books on film theory, and co-authored dozens of studies on the Brazilian cinema and Latin America - including Le Cinéma brésilien (Centre Pompidou, Paris) and Hojas de Cine (Universidad Autonoma Metropolitana, Mexico).

References

External links
"Escrever Cinema" official site for Avellar's film essays

Brazilian film critics
Brazilian_essayists
1936 births
2016 deaths
Brazilian expatriates in Mexico